Clyde McNeill See Jr. (October 20, 1941 – April 6, 2017) was an American politician and lawyer from West Virginia. See served as Speaker of the West Virginia House of Delegates from 1979 to 1985 and was the Democratic nominee for Governor of West Virginia in 1984, a race he lost to Republican Arch Moore.

Early life
Born in Hardy County, West Virginia, See dropped out of high school. He joined the United States Army and received his GED after serving in the United States Army. He received his bachelor's degree from West Virginia University and his law degree from West Virginia University College of Law. He practiced law in Hardy County and lived in Old Fields, West Virginia.

Political career

See served as a Democrat in the West Virginia House of Delegates from 1974 to 1985, where he was noted for his rapid rise in the ranks of House leadership, serving as vice-chairman of the House Judiciary Committee in his first term and becoming Majority Leader in his second term. See was elected Speaker of the House in his third term and served in the position for six years, from 1979 to 1985. See also ran for election for Governor of West Virginia in 1984 and 1988 and lost both elections.

Death

See died at his home in Moorefield, West Virginia from cancer in 2017. The Speaker Clyde See Jr. Exit on Corridor H in Moorefield is named in his honor.

Election Results

Primary election

General election

Notes

1941 births
2017 deaths
People from Moorefield, West Virginia
West Virginia University College of Law alumni
Military personnel from West Virginia
West Virginia lawyers
Speakers of the West Virginia House of Delegates
Democratic Party members of the West Virginia House of Delegates
Deaths from cancer in West Virginia
West Virginia University alumni
20th-century American lawyers